The Alaska Naval Militia (AKNM) is the official naval militia of the state of Alaska. The Alaska Naval Militia falls under control of the state of Alaska. The legal basis for the naval militia comes from both federal and state law.

History
The Alaska Naval Militia was established in 1984. In 1989, the AKNM was deployed to assist in recovery operations after the Exxon Valdez oil spill. In 2019, members of the Alaska Naval Militia were deployed to help fight the Swan Lake Fire in southern Alaska. In March 2020, the Alaska Naval Militia was called to action in response to the COVID-19 epidemic.

Duties
The AKNM has focused on four mission areas:

Medical: Comprehensive medical support, provided by medical, nursing, and paramedical personnel.
Explosive outload team: Specialized cargo handling, with an emphasis on ordnance, provided by trained stevedores, cargo handlers, and safety officers.
Reconnaissance: Route reconnaissance and port security, provided by Marines trained in SOF skills and associated field corpsmen.
Naval construction: Tactical construction, security support, and basic services operations, provided by construction personnel and engineers.

Membership

Unlike state defense forces, naval militias are partially regulated and equipped by the federal government, and as such, membership requirements are in part dictated by federal rules. Under 10 U.S. Code § 8904, in order to be eligible for federal aid, at least 95% of members of the naval militia must also be members of the United States Navy Reserve or the United States Marine Corps Reserve. As such, Alaska law requires that membership be limited to members of the United States Naval Reserve or the United States Marine Corps Reserve.

Equipment
Under federal law, the naval militias of each state may be loaned or given vessels, arms, and equipment from the United States Navy and Marine Corps, and have use of facilities made available to the Navy Reserve and Marine Corps Reserve under regulations prescribed by the Secretary of the Navy.

Legal protection
Employers in Alaska are required by law to grant an unpaid leave of absence to any employee who is a member of the Alaska Naval Militia, and who is activated to perform active state service. The employer must also guarantee the employee's right to return to his or her employment position upon that employee's return from deployment.

See also
 Alaska National Guard
 Alaska State Defense Force
 Alaska Wing Civil Air Patrol
 United States Coast Guard Auxiliary

References

Military in Alaska
State defense forces of the United States
1984 establishments in Alaska